American rock band Alien Ant Farm has released five studio albums, one live album, one compilation album, three extended plays, and nine singles and music videos.

Albums

Studio albums

Compilation albums

Live albums

Extended plays

Singles

References

Discographies of American artists